West Zone is a railway zone operated by Bangladesh Railway. 2,800 km of railway lines in Bangladesh are operated through four divisions in two Zones, West Zone  being one of the two Zone. This Zone consists of Rangpur Division, Rajshahi Division, Faridpur Division and Khulna Division of Bangladesh. The head office of West Zone is located in Rajshahi.

History

References 

Bangladesh Railway